Khanbumbat Airport, also Oyu Tolgoi Airport, is an airport in Khanbogd, Ömnögovi, Mongolia. The airport's construction was funded by the adjacent Oyu Tolgoi mine. It is the second airport in passenger traffic in Mongolia after Buyant-Ukhaa International Airport. The airport serves nearly 100,000 passengers annually.

History

Oyu Tolgoi mine exploration

Canadian-based Ivanhoe Mines discovered the gold-copper ore deposit in 2001 in the Gobi Desert of Mongolia. It is in an area known as Oyu Tolgoi (Mongolian for Turquoise Hill), where in the time of Genghis Khan outcropping rocks were smelted for copper. By 2003 there were 18 exploration drill rigs on the property employing approximately 200 people, and Oyu Tolgoi was the "biggest mining exploration project in the world." In January 2013 Oyu Tolgoi started producing concentrate from the mine.

Airport history
The old building of the airport was built in the 2000s. In 2004 the airport was called "Oyut Airport". The runway was dirt. In 2007 it started accepting passenger flights. The new airport was built in 2012. It opened on 10 February 2013.

Information

Description
Oyu Tolgoi deposits contain (as of 2010) an estimated 79 billion pounds (35,833,000 tonnes) of copper, and 45 million ounces (1,275,000,000 grams) of gold. Production was scheduled to begin in 2013 and to reach full capacity in 2018. Over the anticipated lifespan of the mine (45 years), Oyu Tolgoi is scheduled to produce  of copper per year, an amount equal to 3% of global production. Oyu Tolgoi is also expected to produce 330,000 ounces of gold annually.
Rio Tinto intends to employ 3,000-4,000 people from Mongolia, so a new airport was needed. Khanbumbat Airport is located 207 kilometers northwest of the regional capital of the Dalanzadgad, and 522 kilometers southwest of the national capital of Ulan Bator.

Runways and operational infrastructure
The airport of international standards, its runway has a length of 3259 m, and a width of 45 meters.  It is able to receive Boeing-737 and Airbus A320 aircraft.

The terminal building (designed to mimick a Mongolian ger) is able to cater for up to 240 passengers per hour.

In 2013, 80,000 passengers arrived at the airport. The majority were employees of the Oyu Tolgoi mine from Ulan Bator, including foreigners who connected through Buyant-Ukhaa International Airport. In the future it is possible to open international flights directly to Khanbumbat.

Scheme

Airlines and destinations

Gallery

See also 

 List of airports in Mongolia
 New Ulaanbaatar International Airport
 Tavan Tolgoi

References

External links 
Оюу Толгой ХХК-ны "Ханбумбат" нисэх буудал

Airports in Mongolia
Airports established in 2012